Government House, Regina, Saskatchewan, Canada, was constructed as a residence for the lieutenant governor of the North-West Territories, whose territorial headquarters were in Regina until the provinces of Saskatchewan and Alberta were created out of the Territories in 1905 and Regina became the capital of Saskatchewan.

At that point Government House became the official residence of the lieutenant governor of Saskatchewan, which it remained until 1944 when it was vacated until it was returned to official ceremonial use in 1984.

Design and construction 

A substantial brick and masonry building, the new Government House replaced the cold, draughty wooden pre-constructed clapboard 1883 Government House which stood on the current site of Luther College High School on Dewdney Avenue and Royal Street, five blocks west, until its demolition in 1908.

The 1883 predecessor had been assembled shortly after the decision of the North-West Territories Lieutenant-Governor Edgar Dewdney to relocate the capital from Battleford. In fact it was widely assumed that the new capital would be Troy (renamed Qu'Appelle) or Fort Qu'Appelle, but Dewdney had acquired land at Buffalo Bones which he could and did become rich by selling to settlers, and despite it being without trees, even poplar bluffs or bushes, or water apart from the slight spring run-off Wascana Creek, named it the new capital. Indeed, the street on which Government House is located was named after him. The prefabricated building material was from in eastern Canada and transported to the new site. It was a single story wooden structure consisting of two portable houses later developed into a more imposing structure. Additions were made in 1883, after which it had four bedrooms, two dressing rooms, a drawing room, a dining room, a large and small kitchen with pantry and storeroom, a front veranda and porch, and a conservatory.

The 1891 Government House, then a remarkably substantial brick and masonry building, was designed by the Dominion architect, Thomas Fuller, together with the Territorial government buildings east on Dewdney Avenue. Fuller had earlier designed the 1866 parliament buildings in Ottawa, which had been designed for the capital of the Province of Canada, lasting from 1841 to 1867 and consisting only of Quebec and Ontario.

Government House was completed at a cost of $50,000 and was the first residence in the Territories to be electrified (the Regina YMCA had been electrified in 1890). The Hon. Joseph Royal, Lieutenant-Governor of the North-West Territories 1888–93, was the first to live and work there. A conservatory was built in 1901 and a ballroom in 1929.

Use as a functioning government house 1891-1944 

From its completion in 1891 until the formation of the provinces of Alberta and Saskatchewan in 1905, Government House was the workplace and residence of Lieutenant-Governors of the North-West Territories, the legislative buildings being east on Dewdney Avenue. Lieutenant-Governors Charles Herbert Mackintosh, Malcolm Colin Cameron and Amédée E. Forget lived and worked in it during this time.

In 1901 the Duke and Duchess of York, later King George V and Queen Mary – visited the North-West Territories and were accommodated at Regina's Government House, where they received and met local citizens.

Government buildings were not built south of Wascana Lake until after the province was established in 1905. The Territory's former government buildings on Dewdney Avenue (but not Government House) then ceased having such use, such reduction in public expenditure being widely deemed to be entirely reasonable during a second World War immediately following the Great Depression, intensified on the then substantially agricultural Canadian Prairies by the Great Drought.

After 1 September 1905, Government House was the residence and work-place of six Lieutenant-Governors of Saskatchewan. In 1944 Premier Tommy Douglas, very soon after his election, followed Ontario in closing the provincial vice-regal palace. During that period Government House accommodated several official guests to the province. These included: April, 1906, when Prince Arthur, the Duke of Connaught, visited Regina; and both October 1912 and July 1916, when the Duke and Duchess of Connaught and Princess Patricia visited while the Duke was Governor General, the first time for the Duke, son of Queen Victoria, to inaugurate the Saskatchewan Legislative Assembly. The Prince of Wales, later King Edward VIII, visited Saskatchewan in 1919 and again in 1927, though the Hotel Saskatchewan had opened on Victoria Avenue by the time of his second visit.

A Change in use 

Vice-regal palaces were something of an anomaly in the political climate and difficult economic situation of the Great Depression and World War II throughout North America but particularly on the prairies. In March 1944, during his eighth year in office of Lieutenant-Governor "Archie" McNab closed Government House and sold its contents. He established a small office in the Hotel Saskatchewan on Victoria Avenue downtown, which the Canadian Pacific Railway opened in 1927. Thereafter, such provincial guests as royal visitors were also accommodated in luxury hotels.

The furnishings and household goods were sold at auction and Government House was leased to the federal Department of Veterans Affairs for use as a veterans rehabilitation facility. In 1958, renamed Saskatchewan House, the building entered into 10 years' use as an adult education centre until it was proposed that it be demolished and the site redeveloped. A large part of the extensive grounds had already been sold for the construction of the Pioneer Village nursing home and other uses.

From 1967 John Coulter's play "The Trial of Louis Riel" was performed throughout the summers in the Government House (then "Saskatchewan House") ballroom, arrayed as in photos of the original Supreme Court of the North-West Territories courthouse at the corner of Victoria Avenue and Hamilton Street, Regina, with members of the audience recruited as jurymen. Local lawyer Stephen Arsenych customarily performed the role of Riel.

However, the postwar period of supposed modernisation by demolishing old fashioned-seeming buildings such as the old city hall on 11th Avenue, several downtown movie theatres and both Knox United and Trinity Evangelical Lutheran churches. In 1968, Government House was designated a National Historic Site of Canada and soon came into restoration.

Restoration 
A number of historically minded people belonging to local groups including the Regina Chamber of Commerce, Imperial Order of the Daughters of the Empire, Regina Council of Women, and the City of Regina were brought together to fight for the preservation of and restoration of the building.

In 1971, the Society for the Preservation and Restoration of Saskatchewan House (now the Government House Historical Society) was formed and by 1980 many of its efforts were rewarded. Government House, its original name and historical fittings and many historical contents restored, many such contents having been acquired by departing employees and others when Government House was closed. In 1984, the offices of the Lieutenant-Governor returned to Government House and vice-regal receptions began being held there again, though the Lieutenant-Governors did not resume living in Government House but are housed in accommodation provided by the federal government, reflecting the role of Ottawa in providing vice-regal appointments for the provinces and keeping the entire interior of the building available for public use.

Lieutenant-Governor's New Year's Day Levee and other public receptions 

The tradition of the Lieutenant-Governor holding a New Years Day levée in the Government House foyer and ballroom for the public resumed immediately after the Lieutenant-Governor's offices returned with a receiving line where the Vice-regal party greets the public and fruitcake and sherry are served in the ballroom. Government House is extensively decorated in holiday mode throughout, especially in the ballroom and foyer. Guides in period costume (albeit, curiously, in the costume of the 1780s rather than the 1890s, in mobcaps, tricorne hats, and knee breeches) give free tours of Government House. The Government House Historical Society holds a Victorian tea in the ballroom on some weekends during the spring, summer and fall season.

2005 Visitor and Administration Centre
In 2005, a visitor and administration centre and coach house were added, the new wing opened by Queen Elizabeth II and named in her honour, while the historic older wing was named the Victoria wing. The grounds that remained, after alienation of a substantial proportion of them for the Pioneer Village old peoples' home built in 1967, were restored to their Edwardian configuration as a provincial centennial project. Government House is now "a museum of the 1900 period under Lieutenant-Governor Amédée Forget, and a hospitality facility for government and non-profit organizations."

Alleged haunting 
Over the years, several staff and former students have observed strange occurrences at Government House. Doors have been said to open and close repeatedly with no one near, the sound of crying babies and laughing children have been heard late at night with no one around, and others have claimed to see eerie faces next to theirs when looking into mirrors.

One particular apparition of note is "Howie", believed to be Cheun Lee, the former cook of Lieutenant-Governor Archibald McNab. Many believe that his ghost roams the house; his footsteps often heard shuffling through the halls. He even has a say in the interior decorating—witnesses have inexplicably found objects shifted or moved from one room to another.

Photo gallery

See also
Lieutenant-Governors of Saskatchewan
Monarchy in Saskatchewan
Government Houses of Canada
Government Houses of the British Empire
Saskatchewan Legislative Building

References

Further reading
Drake, Earl G. Regina, the Queen City. Toronto:  McClelland & Stewart Ltd, 1955.
Hryniuk, Margaret and Pugh, Garth. "A Tower of Attraction" An Illustrated History of Government House, Regina, Saskatchewan. Regina: Canadian Plains Research Center, 1991.

External links 
 Government House website
Listing on Canadian Registry of Historic Places
 Government House Historical Society

Houses completed in 1891
Government buildings completed in 1891
Buildings and structures in Regina, Saskatchewan
Reportedly haunted locations in Saskatchewan
Saskatchewan
National Historic Sites in Saskatchewan
Veterans' hospitals
Schools in Saskatchewan
Museums in Regina, Saskatchewan
History museums in Saskatchewan